The 2020 Miami Hurricanes baseball team represents the University of Miami during the 2020 NCAA Division I baseball season. The Hurricanes play their home games at Alex Rodriguez Park at Mark Light Field as a member of the Atlantic Coast Conference. They are led by head coach Gino DiMare, in his second year as head coach.

Previous season
The Hurricanes finished the 2019 season with a 41–20 record, compiling an 18–12 mark in the ACC to finish second in the Coastal Division.  After a 1–1 finish in the ACC Tournament, the Canes earned an at-large bid to the NCAA Tournament.  They reached the Final of the Starkville Regional, and as a result earned a ranking of 19 in the final D1Baseball poll.

Personnel

Roster

Coaching Staff

Schedule

Ranking Movements

^ Collegiate Baseball ranks 40 teams in their preseason poll, but only ranks 30 teams weekly during the season.
† NCBWA ranks 35 teams in their preseason poll, but only ranks 30 teams weekly during the season.
* New poll was not released for this week so for comparison purposes the previous week's ranking is inserted in this week's slot.

2020 MLB draft

References

Miami
Miami Hurricanes baseball seasons
Miami Baseball